Mothballing may refer to:

 Aircraft boneyard
 Mothballs
 Reserve fleet